The Marail guan or Cayenne guan (Penelope marail) is a species of bird in the family Cracidae, the chachalacas, guans, and curassows. It is found in Brazil, French Guiana, Guyana, Suriname, and Venezuela.

Taxonomy and systematics

The Marail guan has the two subspecies listed in the box to the right. It and the rusty-margined guan (P. superciliaris) form a superspecies.

Description

Males weigh  and females . The back, wings, and central tail feathers of the nominate subspecies are dark with a greenish olive gloss. The outer tail feathers are bluish black. Its throat and chest are dark with white speckles and the belly reddish brown. It has a red dewlap. P. m. jacupeba is slightly smaller, paler, and more a grayish brown.

Distribution and habitat

The nominate subspecies of Marail guan is found from eastern Venezuela through the Guianas. P. m. jacupeba is found in northern Brazil north of the Amazon River and possibly in southeastern Venezuela, although not all authorities accept the latter. It mostly inhabits mature tropical forest though it can be found in secondary forest. In the Guianas and Brazil is favors terre firma forest with dense undergrowth.

Behavior

Movement

The Marail guan appears to be sedentary.

Feeding

The Marail guan forages singly or in groups of up to six, mostly in the canopy and lower levels of the forest but sometimes on the ground. Its diet is almost entirely fruits though insects are occasionally taken.

Breeding

The Marail guan's breeding season varies within its range. It appears to span from October to February in the Guianas and extend further in Brazil. It builds a cup nest high in a tree fork and lays two or three eggs.

Vocal and non-vocal sounds

The Marail guan gives a wing-whirring display, usually before dawn, and usually follows it with a barking "whaf, whaf, whaf". It also gives the barking calls at dusk.

Status

The IUCN has assessed the Marail guan as being of Least Concern. It is fairly common to common throughout its large range but like all guans is subject to hunting pressure.

References

Marail guan
Birds of the Guianas
Marail guan
Taxonomy articles created by Polbot